Zinho Vanheusden (born 29 July 1999) is a Belgian professional footballer who plays as a centre-back for Eredivisie club AZ Alkmaar on loan from Italian Serie A club Inter Milan. He also represents the Belgium national football team.

Club career

Inter Milan 
In mid-2015, Vanheusden joined Inter Milan's youth academy after 7 seasons in the Standard Liège youth system. He was promoted to the first team in the last few matches of 2016–17 Serie A; he also appeared as an unused bench for a few matches at the start of 2017–18 Serie A. He also played for the under-19 team as the starting defender, winning 2016–17 Campionato Nazionale Primavera. On 27 September 2017, Vanheusden injured his cruciate ligament in a UEFA Youth League match against FC Dynamo Kyiv, which kept him out of action for four months. On 26 January 2018, Vanheusden extended his contract with Inter until June 2022.

Loan to Standard Liège 
On 30 January 2018, Vanheusden joined the Standard Liège until 30 June 2018, with an option to extend for one more year. Vanheusden made his professional debut with Standard Liège in a 1–0 Belgian First Division A playoff win over K.A.A. Gent on 14 April 2018.

Standard Liège 
On 28 June 2019, Standard Liège signed Vanheusden in a permanent deal for a reported €12.5 million fee, which surpassed Nicolae Stanciu's record as the most expensive purchase by a  Belgium club.

Return to Inter Milan 
On 13 July 2021, he returned to Inter Milan.

Loan to Genoa 
On 20 July, he was sent on loan to Genoa. He made his Serie A debut on 21 August against Inter away at the Giuseppe Meazza in a 4–0 loss to his team.

Loan to AZ 
On 25 July 2022, Vanheusden was loaned by AZ in the Netherlands, with an option to buy.

International career
Vanheusden debuted with the Belgium national team in a 1–1 friendly draw with Ivory Coast on 8 October 2020.

Personal life
Vanheusden is named after the Brazilian footballer, Zinho after his performance at the 1994 FIFA World Cup.

Career statistics

References

External links
 
 Standard Profile

1999 births
Sportspeople from Hasselt
Footballers from Limburg (Belgium)
Living people
Belgian footballers
Belgium international footballers
Belgium under-21 international footballers
Belgium youth international footballers
Standard Liège players
Inter Milan players
Genoa C.F.C. players
AZ Alkmaar players
Belgian Pro League players
Serie A players
Association football defenders
Belgian expatriate footballers
Belgian expatriate sportspeople in Italy
Expatriate footballers in Italy
Belgian expatriate sportspeople in the Netherlands
Expatriate footballers in the Netherlands